Des Wahnsinns fette Beute ("Madness' juicy prey") is the eleventh studio album by German rock band Oomph!. It was described by the band as being a big change from their normal gothic and industrial type of music. This made the album highly anticipated amongst fans and the German rock music community. One single was released from the album, "Zwei Schritte vor" (Two Steps Forward), on 4 May 2012.

Track listing

Bonus DVD
 Studio report "Des Wahnsinns fette Beute"
 Zwei Schritte Neon
 Geister Regen
 Spiegel Seemann
 Photo gallery (Oomph! vs. Oliver Rath)
 Zwei Schritte vor (Video)
 Zwei Schritte vor "Making of"
 Ernten was wir säen (Video)

References

Oomph! albums
2012 albums
German-language albums